El Satanico Dr. Cadillac (Spanish for The Satanic Dr. Cadillac) Released in 1989 is the fourth studio album from the Argentine Ska, reggae band Los Fabulosos Cadillacs.

In 1989, begins a period of creative downhill along with the economic crisis that Argentina was going through, this got reflected in sales and quality of production of this album.

The album's (and title track's) title come from the Spanish title for the James Bond film Dr. No, "El Satánico Dr. No" (The Satanic Dr. No)

Reception
The Allmusic review by Victor W. Valdivia awarded the album 2.5 stars stating "The Cadillacs are still not quite more than the sum of their influences (except on the standout title track), but they are developing a distinctive style that would flourish on later releases. ".

Track listing 

 "El Satánico Dr. Cadillac" ("The Satanic Dr. Cadillac")  (Vicentico) – 4:00   
 "El Mensaje Soy Yo" ("The Message is Me") (Vicentico) – 2:20  
 "Chico Perdido" ("Lost Boy") (Vicentico, Flavio Cianciarulo) – 3:50 
 "Mi Nombre Es Travis" ("My Name is Travis") (Flavio Cianciarulo, Vicentico, Sergio Rotman) – 3:50 
 "El Golpe de Tu Corazón" ("The Punch of Your Heart") (Cianciarulo, Vicentico) – 4:10 
 "Contrabando de Amor" ("Smuggling of love") (Vicentico) – 3:27 
 "Fiebre '90" ("Fever '90") (Vicentico, Cianciarulo, Rotman) – 4:23 
 "Rudy (Un Mensaje Para Vos)" ("Rudy (A message to you)") (R. Thompson) – 2:22 
 "El Sonido Joven de América" ("The Young Sound of America") (Cianciarulo) – 2:45
 "Todas las Cosas Que Ella Me Dio" ("All the Things That She Gave Me") (Siperman, Vicentico, Rotman) – 3:35 
 "Verano Salvaje" ("Savage Summer") (Cianciarulo, Vicentico) – 3:05

Personnel 

 Vicentico – vocals
 Flavio Cianciarulo — bass
 Anibal Rigozzi – guitar
 Mario Siperman – keyboard
 Fernando Ricciardi – drums
 Luciano Giugno – percussion
 Naco Goldfinger – tenor saxophone
 Sergio Rotman – alto saxophone
 Daniel Lozano – trumpet & flugelhorn

External links 
 Los Fabulosos Cadillacs Official Web Site
El Satanico Dr. Cadillac at MusicBrainz
[ El Satanico Dr. Cadillac] at Allmusic
El Satanico Dr. Cadillac at Discogs

References 

Los Fabulosos Cadillacs albums
Sony Music Argentina albums
1989 albums